Al-Jazeera University in Damascus/Deir ez Zor, is a private university located in Damascus, Syria. JUDE was originally established in Deir Ezzor in 2007 as the first private university in eastern Syria. Having a focus on teaching Pharmacy, Engineering and Business Sciences, JUDE became popular educational institution especially after being moved to be in Damascus /the universities agglomeration on the road between Damascus and Deraa.

The College of Engineering has three departments: Civil Engineering, Architectural Engineering, Informatics, College of Business Administration, and College of Pharmacy.

References

External links
 Official Website

 https://www.facebook.com/jude.edu.sy/photos/a.413599998733945/2685318104895445/?type=3&eid=ARDL4KkFcfSGr0tpJZ3wQcN5OcrgeiGMIp869plVub-WlDHRSjDF6hOQp_qeMEwYQgQK_zyN9bYcFJPa&__tn__=EEHH-R
 :ar:%D8%AC%D8%A7%D9%85%D8%B9%D8%A9 %D8%A7%D9%84%D8%AC%D8%B2%D9%8A%D8%B1%D8%A9 %D8%A7%D9%84%D8%AE%D8%A7%D8%B5%D8%A9#/map/0

Jazeera University
Jazeera University
Organizations based in Damascus
2007 establishments in Syria